Vineeta may refer to::

 Vineeta Bal (active from before 2016), Indian immunologist
 Vineeta Rai (born before 1968), Indian civil servant
 Vineeta Rastogi (1968-1995), American AIDS activist, public health worker and Peace Corps Volunteer
 Vineeta Rishi (born 1981), English actress
 Vineeta Foundation, which operates in the field of public health and human rights, named after Vineeta Rastogi

See also
 Vinita (disambiguation)